Christopher and Johanna Twelker Farm is a historic home and farm located near New Haven, Franklin County, Missouri. The farmhouse was built by German immigrants in 1871, and is a two-story, five bay, stone I-house with a -story rear ell.  Also on the property are the contributing gambrel-roofed frame barn (c. 1910) and a small frame summer kitchen (c. 1910).

It was listed on the National Register of Historic Places in 2016.

References

Houses on the National Register of Historic Places in Missouri
Farms on the National Register of Historic Places in Missouri
Houses completed in 1871
Buildings and structures in Franklin County, Missouri
National Register of Historic Places in Franklin County, Missouri